Wilfred  "Wilfredo" Benítez (born September 12, 1958) is an American-born Puerto Rican former professional boxer and the youngest world champion in the sport's history. Earning his first of three career world titles in separate weight divisions at the age of seventeen, he is best remembered as a skilled and aggressive fighter with exceptional defensive abilities, along with his fights with Roberto Durán, Thomas Hearns, and Sugar Ray Leonard.

Inducted into the International Boxing Hall of Fame in 1996, he is considered among the best Puerto Rican boxers of all time, sharing the honor with Félix Trinidad, Wilfredo Gómez, Carlos Ortiz, Héctor Camacho, Edwin Rosario and Miguel Cotto.

Early history
Benítez turned pro at 15, a young prodigy who was managed by his father Gregorio Benítez, was a member of one of Puerto Rico's boxing families, his brothers Frankie and Gregory Benítez having also been top contenders in the 1970s. The Benítez troop was largely directed by their mother, Clara Benítez. Young Wilfred was nicknamed "The Radar" for his uncanny ability to foresee and dodge his opponent's blows. He grew up going to a neighborhood boxing gym in New York, where he learned from watching his brothers and other local, renowned fighters practice their skills.

During the early stages of his professional career, Benítez often traveled to the Netherlands Antilles and New York City for fights. He divided his fights between those locations and Puerto Rico.  The proximity of those two locations to Puerto Rico helped him start to become a household name in the island while building an international following at the same time. His speed, combined with punching power and surprising ring maturity for a 16-year-old, were enough to make him a world-ranked boxer by both the WBA and WBC, then boxing's only world-title recognizing organizations.

Professional boxing career
On March 6, 1976, at age 17, with his high school classmates in attendance, he faced Lineal and  WBA Light Welterweight champion Antonio Cervantes. Known as Kid Pambele, the champion was 30 years old, had a record of 74-9-3 with 35 KO's, and had made 10 title defenses. The result was a fifteen-round split decision in Benítez's favor. Benítez retained the championship three times, and then moved up to the welterweight division.

Moving up 
Benítez challenged Lineal and WBC World Champion Carlos Palomino in San Juan. On January 14, 1979, Benítez won a fifteen-round split decision to become a world champion in a second weight division. Referee Zach Clayton scored the fight 145-142 in Palomino's favor, but judges Jay Edson and Harry Gibbs disagreed. Edson scored the bout 146-142 for Benítez. Gibbs also scored for Benítez, 146-143.  After outpointing Harold Weston Jr. in his first defense (avenging an earlier draw), Benítez fought Sugar Ray Leonard in Las Vegas, Nevada on November 30, 1979.

Fighting Sugar Ray Leonard 

It was a scientific fight by both fighters, who demonstrated their defensive skills throughout the bout. Benítez suffered a third-round knockdown and a cut on his forehead, which was opened by an accidental head butt in round six. Leonard put Benítez down again in the fifteenth round and the referee stopped the fight with six seconds left in round fifteen. Leonard was ahead on all cards at the time of the stoppage. The scores were 137–133, 137–130 and 136–134, all for Leonard.

Moving up again 

After that loss, Benítez again moved up in weight, and on May 23, 1981, at age 22, he became the youngest three-time world champion in boxing history by knocking out WBC World Super Welterweight Champion Maurice Hope in twelve rounds in Las Vegas. The knockout was named one of the knockouts of the year.

His next fight became a historic bout. On November 14, 1981, he fought future world champ Carlos Santos of Ceiba, Puerto Rico. It was the first world championship fight between two Puerto Ricans in boxing history. It was fought 3,000 miles away from Puerto Rico, at Caesar's Palace in Las Vegas. Benítez won a fifteen-round unanimous decision. His next defense was against Roberto Durán, whom Benítez defeated at Caesar's Palace on January 30, 1982 by a fifteen-round unanimous decision. On December 3, 1982, at the Carnival of Champions in New Orleans, Benítez lost the belt to another boxing legend, Thomas Hearns, by a fifteen-round majority decision.

Career decline
Benítez's career went downwards after the fight with Hearns, as did his lifestyle. In 1983, he lost a unanimous decision to Mustafa Hamsho. In 1984, he tried a comeback under the hand of Yamil Chade, but this proved unsuccessful as he was knocked out in the second round by Davey Moore. On November 28, 1986, with his health declining, Benítez went to Salta, Argentina to fight against middleweight Carlos Herrera. Benítez was stopped in seven rounds. But to make matters worse, his money for the fight was stolen by the promoter, along with his documents and passport, and he was stranded in Argentina for over a year. After eventually being tracked down, and after much government huddling and talks, he was finally able to fly back home to Puerto Rico in 1988.

In 1990, with his health in increasingly worse shape, Benítez moved to Tucson, Arizona, where he tried another comeback under the tutelage of Emanuel Steward, the Kronk trainer. This also proved unsuccessful, as he went 2-2 in his last four fights. His last bout took place in Winnipeg, Canada on September 18, 1990, six days after his 32nd birthday. He lost a ten-round decision against Scott Papasadora.

Professional boxing record

Retirement and illness
After retiring from boxing in late 1990, Benítez returned to Puerto Rico, where he lived with his mother Clara on a $200 a month pension provided by the World Boxing Council. Since 1989, Benítez has suffered from an incurable, degenerative brain condition caused by the blows that he took in the ring.

In 1997, Benítez was moved to a public nursing home for medical reasons by his mother Clara, a licensed nurse.

In 2002, Sugar Ray Leonard visited Benítez, who by this time had forgotten his identity. During the visit, their fight was shown on television. Consequently, Benítez remembered the event and said to Leonard, "Ray, I did not train for that fight."

In 2004, Benítez was diagnosed with diabetes, adding further complications to his worsening health. When his mother died in the summer of 2008, his sister Yvonne Benítez, took over his care.

In 2018, after Hurricane Maria destroyed his home and made it difficult for Benítez to receive therapy, an old friend and boxing mate, Luis Mateo, helped Benítez and his sister move to Chicago. It was their hope that in Chicago, Benítez would receive better health care.

Support, recovery and public appearance
Ring 10, a non-profit organization that helps impoverished former fighters, provides a monthly stipend to Benítez and established "The Wilfred Benítez Fund" to raise more money to aid the fallen champion.

During 2012, Benítez was honored with a statue in Puerto Rico.

On November 27, 2012, a smiling and healthy looking Benítez attended the funeral of Hector Camacho in Puerto Rico, arriving in a wheelchair. Benítez arrived accompanied by boxers Félix Trinidad, Wilfredo Gómez, and Alfredo Escalera. Surprising the mourners, Benítez rose to his feet for a boxing pose in front of Camacho's coffin.

With the emotional and financial assistance of former Benitez sparring partner Luis Mateo and Chicago's Puerto Rican community, on June 1, 2018, in the aftermath of Hurricane Maria, Wilfred Benitez, age 59, and his sister Yvonne Benitez, arrived in Chicago, Illinois, where he spent the first week in the hospital, then was moved to an apartment on Chicago's West Side. Donations from the Chicago Puerto Rican community helped pay for the plane tickets, and continue ongoing to provide expense money for the apartment, food, and other necessities, according to Mateo and Yvonne Benitez. Wilfred appears in overall better health, good spirits, has gained weight, tries to talk, and is more alert since his arrival in the mainland United States.

Awards and recognitions

Benítez was inducted to the International Boxing Hall of Fame in 1994.
Key to the City Carolina, Puerto Rico (1984)

See also

List of world light-welterweight boxing champions
List of world welterweight boxing champions
List of world light-middleweight boxing champions
List of boxing triple champions
List of Puerto Rican boxing world champions
Sports in Puerto Rico
Afro–Puerto Ricans

References

External links

Ian Palmer's Tigerboxing.com article on Benítez
Benítez's website
Faded Memories

 

|-

1958 births
Living people
Puerto Rican male boxers
Boxers from New York City
People from Carolina, Puerto Rico
World light-welterweight boxing champions
World welterweight boxing champions
World light-middleweight boxing champions
World Boxing Association champions
World Boxing Council champions
The Ring (magazine) champions
International Boxing Hall of Fame inductees